The Qujing Cultural and Sports Park is a public park and sports venue in Qujing, Yunnan, China. It has a multipurpose stadium used mostly for soccer matches called Qujing City Sports Center Stadium, with 34,162 seats, a 6,176-seat indoor stadium, and an 18,000-square-meter multipurpose training center. The Qujing government invested 2.1 billion yuan to build the park and its sports facilities. The park opened in 2014.

In 2016, the sports park hosted international soccer, basketball, and tennis matches, as well as national boxing, beach volleyball, and basketball games.

References

Football venues in China
Multi-purpose stadiums in China
Qujing
Parks in Yunnan
Sports venues in Yunnan